Kaskihá (Cashquiha) is a language of the Paraguayan Chaco. It is one of several that go by the generic name Guaná.

References

Languages of Paraguay
Mascoian languages
Endangered languages
Chaco linguistic area